Eminem Presents: The Re-Up or simply, The Re-Up, is a compilation album performed by various artists of American record label, Shady Records. The album features performances by Shady Records artists Eminem, D12, 50 Cent, Obie Trice, Stat Quo, Bobby Creekwater and Cashis, while affiliated artists such as Lloyd Banks, Akon and Nate Dogg, made guest appearances. The album debuted at number two on the US Billboard 200 chart and has since sold over one million copies in the US alone, being certified platinum by the RIAA.

Background 
The album began as a street mixtape project; an underground, unofficial CD with raw production values. "But what happened is that the material was so good and the tracks were getting produced like a regular album", Eminem said: "Instead of putting it out there rough and unfinished, I thought we should add some other new tracks, make it a real album, and put it in the record stores to give these new artists a real boost".

Rampant misinformation about Eminem Presents: The Re-Up included many false internet track listings and the claim that the mixtape would be a tribute to the late Proof of D12. "The D12 album and those unreleased songs with Proof are coming", said Eminem, "but The Re-Up is about these new artists and these new songs. It isn't fair to them or to the memory of Proof to mix them up".

The Re-Up's cover art was drawn by Eminem personally, and depicts the featured artists except for Akon and Nate Dogg, the only two artists that are not signed to Shady, Aftermath or G-Unit.

Reception 

Critical response to Eminem Presents: The Re-Up  was mixed. At Metacritic, which assigns a normalized rating out of 100 to reviews from mainstream critics, the album has received an average score of 50, based on the 13 reviews.

Commercial performance 
Eminem Presents: The Re-Up debuted at number 2 on US Billboard 200 chart, selling about 309,000 copies in its first week. In its second week, the album fell to number 13 in the Billboard 200, selling 151,000 copies. As of March 16, 2007, the album was certified platinum by the Recording Industry Association of America (RIAA), for selling of one million copies in the United States.  As of January 2016, worldwide sales are at 2,051,000.

Track listing 

Notes
 signifies an additional producer

Charts

Weekly charts

Year-end charts

Certifications

References

2006 compilation albums
Eminem compilation albums
Albums produced by the Alchemist (musician)
Albums produced by Disco D
Albums produced by Dr. Dre
Albums produced by Eminem
Albums produced by Focus...
Record label compilation albums
Shady Records compilation albums
Hip hop compilation albums